Anders Hjalmar Linder (born 27 August 1941 in Solna, Sweden) is a Swedish actor and jazz musician. His father is Erik Hjalmar Linder and his son is Olle Linder. He is mainly known from the children's programs Ville, Valle och Viktor, Vintergatan, Björnes magasin and Kapten Zoom.

Linder is a trained architect from the Royal Institute of Technology in Stockholm, but only worked half-time as an architect for two years before his stage career took over entirely.

References

External links 
 
 
 

Swedish male actors
Swedish architects
KTH Royal Institute of Technology alumni
1941 births
Living people
Swedish jazz musicians